The hu hu is a string instrument originating in 19th century China.  It is similar to the erhu and is typically made of wood, snakeskin, fabric, glue, bamboo, and horsehair.

See also 
 Chinese music

References 

Chinese musical instruments
String instruments